Joseph Edward Kerbel (May 3, 1921 – March 20, 1973) was an American football coach. He is the second winningest coach in West Texas A&M Buffaloes history.

After a successful coaching career at Bartlesville and Cleveland High School in Oklahoma, Kerbel became head coach at Breckenridge High School in 1952. Breckenridge had won its first 3A state title in 1951 under coach Cooper Robbins who had just left for Texas A&M, raising the expectations high for Kerbel. He did not disappoint, as he won two additional state championships in 1952 and 1954. He then left for Texas football powerhouse Amarillo High School, which had won four state championships under coaches Blair Cherry and Howard Lynch.

After coaching at Amarillo High School for three seasons, Kerbel became an assistant under DeWitt Weaver at Texas Tech University in 1957. He then took over a West Texas A&M football program in 1960 that had won just two games in two years under head coach Clark Jarnagin. Kerbel turned the program around, amassing a 68–42–1 record the next eleven years and winning two bowl games, the 1962 Sun Bowl and 1967 Junior Rose Bowl, along the way. Notable players for Kerbel included Stan Hansen, Mercury Morris, Duane Thomas, Jerry Don Logan and three-time All Texas Defensive Back, Thomas Krempasky. Kerbel retired in 1971 after the school chose not to renew his contract. He was succeeded by Gene Mayfield, a native of Quitaque in Briscoe County, Texas. Kerbel died of a heart attack at the age of 51.

Head coaching record

College

Further reading

References

External links
 

1921 births
1973 deaths
Texas Tech Red Raiders football coaches
West Texas A&M Buffaloes athletic directors
West Texas A&M Buffaloes football coaches
High school football coaches in Oklahoma
High school football coaches in Texas
People from Seminole, Oklahoma